Spey River may refer to:

 River Spey, Scotland, important for the scotch whisky distilleries along its banks
 Spey River (Ontario)
 Spey River (Southland) in New Zealand
 Spey River (Tasman) in New Zealand